The Grand Prix de France is an international, senior-level figure skating competition held as part of the ISU Grand Prix of Figure Skating series. It was previously known as the Grand Prix International de Paris (1987–1993), Trophée de France (1994–1995, 2016), Trophée Lalique (1996–2003), Trophée Éric Bompard (2004–2015), and Internationaux de France (2017–2021). Medals are awarded in the disciplines of men's singles, ladies' singles, pair skating, and ice dancing. Organized by the French Federation of Ice Sports, the event is most often held in Paris but is also hosted by other cities – Albertville in 1991, Lyon in 1994, Bordeaux in 1995, 2014, and 2015, Grenoble from 2017 to 2021, and Angers in 2022 and 2023.

History
The competition was first held in 1987 in Paris as the Grand Prix International de Paris. In 1991, Albertville hosted it as a pre-Olympic event. In 1994, it took place in Lyon and became known as Trophée de France. It retained the name in 1995 when it was held in Bordeaux as part of the inaugural ISU Champions Series (Grand Prix series). In 1996, it returned to Paris and was renamed to reflect a sponsor, the glassware company Lalique.

The Éric Bompard company co-sponsored the event with Lalique from 1999 through 2003 before becoming the chief sponsor in 2004. The competition's title was then changed to Trophée Éric Bompard.

The competition was held in Bordeaux in 2014 and 2015. In 2015, it was canceled after the first day of competition due to the November 2015 Paris attacks; the standings after the short segments were deemed the final results.

In the summer of 2016, the Éric Bompard company decided to end its sponsorship after its questions to the French Federation of Ice Sports (FFSG) received no response. The event returned to Paris and the name Trophée de France in 2016. The following year, it moved to Grenoble and became known as Internationaux de France.

The 2020 competition was cancelled because of the COVID-19 pandemic.

Medalists

Men

Ladies

Pairs

Ice dancing

References

External links

 Le Trophée Éric Bompard (2004-2015)  Oct.21 2020, at the Wayback Machine.

 
ISU Grand Prix of Figure Skating
International figure skating competitions hosted by France
Recurring sporting events established in 1987
1987 establishments in France